The 2011–12 Russian Premier League was the 20th season of the Russian football championship since the dissolution of the Soviet Union and 10th under the current Russian Premier League name. The season began on 12 March 2011. The last matches were played on 22 May 2012, as the league switched to an autumn-spring rhythm. Zenit were the defending champions, and managed to successfully defend their title.

Competition modus changes
The 2011–12 season is a transitional season, as it will stretch over 18 months instead of the conventional 12 months. The unusual length of the season is the result of the decision to adapt the playing year to an autumn-spring rhythm similar to most of the other UEFA leagues.

The season will comprise two phases. The first phase will consist of a regular home-and-away schedule, meaning that each team will play the other teams twice for a total of 30 matches per team. The league will then be split into two groups for the second phase, where each team plays another home-and-away schedule against every other team of its respective group.

The top eight teams of the first phase will compete for the championship and the spots for both the 2012–13 Champions League and Europa League. Accordingly, the bottom eight teams will have to avoid relegation. The bottom two teams of this group will be directly relegated, while the 13th- and 14-placed teams will compete in a relegation/promotion playoff with the third- and fourth-placed teams of the 2011–12 National League Championship.

Teams
Alania Vladikavkaz and Sibir Novosibirsk were relegated at the end of the 2010 season after finishing the season in the bottom two places. Both teams returned to the First Division, rechristened the National League Championship starting with the 2011–12 season, after just one year.

The relegated teams were replaced by 2010 First Division champions Kuban Krasnodar and runners-up Volga Nizhny Novgorod. Kuban made their immediate return to the Premier League, while Volga is playing their first season at the highest football level of Russia.

In further team changes, Saturn Moscow Oblast was forced to withdraw from the league due to financial reasons. The club did not return at any level of Russian football in the 2011–12 season, as the club was eventually disbanded after amassing debts of RUB 800m. Their former farm club, FC Saturn-2 Moscow Oblast, participates in the Russian Second Division in 2011. Amkar Perm, who originally requested to withdraw as well, revoked this request on 24 January 2011.

In a meeting on 25 January 2011, an extraordinary general meeting of Premier League clubs decided to replace Saturn with FC Krasnodar, the fifth-placed team from the 2010 First Division. Similar to Volga Nizhny Novgorod, Krasnodar made their debut at the Premier League.

Managerial changes

Season events

Grigoryev affair
In early 2011, the contracts of three young FC Spartak Moscow players (Maksim Grigoryev, Dmitri Malyaka and Yevgeni Filippov) expired, and they decided to switch to FC Rostov. According to Russian football regulations, when a player under 23 years of age who was raised in the club system transfers to a different club after his contract expires, his old club is due compensation from his new club. If the new club plays on the third level (Russian Second Division), the compensation is the player's 5 previous years' salary multiplied by 1, if his new club is in the National League Championship, it's multiplied by 2 and if it's a Russian Premier League club, it's multiplied by 3. The three players signed with a Russian Second Division team FC MITOS Novocherkassk who immediately loaned them to the Russian Premier League team FC Rostov. Spartak lodged a complaint with the Russian Football Union, claiming this was not a fair transfer as the only reason for it was to lower the compensation that FC Rostov was due to pay Spartak. After the protest was declined on 29 March 2011, Grigoryev was registered for FC Rostov and scored a goal on his debut against FC Lokomotiv Moscow on 2 April 2011, the game ended with a score of 1–1. FC Lokomotiv's president, Olga Smorodskaya, filed a complaint with the Russian Football Union and Premier League, claiming Grigoryev was not eligible to be registered and play for FC Rostov. Before the protest was heard, Grigoryev scored a goal in Rostov's 2–1 victory over FC Dynamo Moscow in the 2010–11 Russian Cup quarterfinal. The protest was heard by the RFU's Dispute Resolution Chamber on 21 April 2011. Smorodskaya insisted that FC MITOS did not have the transfer certificate from Spartak in their possession before the transfer deadline and therefore could not have legally registered Grigoryev. The protest was declined as, according to the league, Grigoryev et al. were registered with RFPL before the transfer deadline, even though they were not included on the official rosters on the league's website or in any other sources. The official league website actually still lists the date of their registration as 1 April. In another twist, in January 2012, Lokomotiv signed Grigoryev from FC MITOS. In March 2012, Court of Arbitration for Sport began considering Grigoryev's case. CAS made their decision in May 2012, denying Lokomotiv's appeal.

Zenit St. Petersburg - CSKA affair
According to the league regulations, every team has to put at least one player with a Russian citizenship born in 1990 or later on their game roster in every game (even if the player in question stays on the bench). If there is no such player or players, the team guilty is punished by the victory being awarded to their opponent and a fine. In the game against PFC CSKA Moscow on 10 April 2011, Zenit St. Petersburg did not have such a player in their lineup (the game ended in 1–1 draw). The youngest player was born in 1989. After the game, Russian Football Union president Sergei Fursenko said that Zenit would likely be awarded a defeat for breaking the regulations. Zenit manager Luciano Spalletti said after the game that they did this intentionally, as they were told it is punishable by a fine only, and the team was ready to pay the fine. They have done the same thing in the 2010 season and fine was the only punishment. However, the regulations were updated in December 2010, and the current exact language of Article 109 of the Disciplinary Regulations of the RFU states it is punishable by "a defeat awarded and a fine", not "a defeat awarded or a fine". Zenit was awarded a defeat by the RFU on 13 April. Zenit removed Vladislav Radimov, who as team director was responsible for filing the game roster with the league, from his position to the reserve team's assistant coach position, with a reduction in salary. Zenit's lawyer was punished by the club by having his bonus cancelled.

Following the RFU decision, the Premier League further decided that the goals scored by Mark González and Konstantin Zyryanov would not count for their scoring totals, but the yellow cards received in the game would count for disciplinary purposes.

Dejan Radić and Sergei Narubin injuries

On 23 April 2011 during a FC Rostov - FC Terek Grozny game, Rostov goalkeeper Dejan Radić collided with Terek's Zaur Sadayev fighting for a high ball. He had to be rushed into the hospital and after it was discovered that his kidney is seriously injured, he had to undergo nephrectomy (surgical removal of a kidney). His club, FC Rostov, announced that he will continue to receive all the bonuses he would have received if he was able to play as a starter during the time of his recovery. Former Russian international Valeri Minko, who played more than 200 games after undergoing nephrectomy himself after an in-game collision, said he expects Radić to fully recover and play again. Despite Rostov's initial promises, Radić stopped getting paid by Rostov in June 2011 and have not received any money stipulated in his contract from that time until March 2012. Terek and Chechnya's president Ramzan Kadyrov have paid him $50,000 as a goodwill gesture.

On 21 May 2011 FC Amkar Perm goalkeeper Sergei Narubin was seriously injured in a collision with FC Rostov's Kornel Saláta. He had to undergo splenectomy (surgical removal of the spleen).

Tom Tomsk futility record
FC Tom Tomsk was not able to score a single goal in 12 consecutive games from game day 18 (30 July) to game day 29 (30 October), they played 1166 minutes of game time without scoring a goal. They finally scored on the last game day of the first stage on 5 November. They only gained 1 point in those 12 games; when the series started, they were 9th in the league in goals scored with 18 goals in 17 games. The previous mark was set by FC Lokomotiv Moscow who could not score for 10 consecutive games and 943 minutes in the 1954 Soviet Top League.

First phase

League table

Results

First phase top goalscorers

Last updated: 6 November 2011
Source: Russian Premier League

Second phase
After the first 30 fixtures, teams were split into two groups of eight which play against each other on a home-and-away basis. Fixtures 31 and 32 were scheduled to be held on the weekends of the 3rd and the 4th weeks of November 2011 respectively. Fixture 33 will take place on 3–4 March 2012. The matches of Fixture 44 (the last one) will start simultaneously at 11 a.m. GMT on 13 May 2012. Russian Football Union decided to set up the calendar for the championship group manually, instead of the computer draw. The computer draw will be done only for the relegation group. The final version of the second phase calendar became available on 7 November 2011.

Championship group
The top eight teams of the first phase participate in this group, which will decide which team will win the championship. Additionally, teams in this group compete for two 2012–13 Champions League and three Europa League spots.

The winners will qualify for the Champions League group stage, with the runners-up earning a spot in the third qualifying round. Furthermore, the third-placed team will qualify for the play-off round of the Europa League, with the fourth- and fifth-placed teams earning spots in the third qualifying round and second qualifying round, respectively.

An additional Europa League play-off round spot is awarded to the winners of the 2011–12 Russian Cup. However, depending on the final league placement of both finalists, the allocation of all four Europa League spots may vary according to the table below.

Championship group table

Championship group results

Championship group top goalscorers

Last updated: 13 May 2012
Source: Russian Premier League

Relegation group
The bottom eight teams of the first phase will determine the teams to be relegated to the 2012–13 National League Championship. The bottom two teams of this group will be directly relegated, while the fifth- and sixth-placed teams will have to compete in relegation/promotion playoffs with the third- and fourth-placed teams of the 2011–12 National League Championship.

Relegation group table

Relegation group results

Relegation group top goalscorers

Last updated: 13 May 2012
Source: Russian Premier League

Relegation play-offs

First leg

Second leg

FC Volga Nizhny Novgorod won 2–1 on aggregate.

FC Rostov won 4–0 on aggregate.

Awards
On 15 May 2012 Russian Football Union named its list of 33 top players:

Medal squads

References

Russian Premier League seasons
1
Rus